Soul City is a community in Warren County, North Carolina, United States. It was a planned community first proposed in 1969 by Floyd McKissick, a civil rights leader and director of the Congress of Racial Equality. Funded by the United States Department of Housing and Urban Development, Soul City was one of thirteen model city projects under the Urban Growth and New Community Development Act.

Goals and plans

After the 1968 Civil Rights bill was passed, many civil rights activists focused on the economic development in black communities so African Americans could take advantage of the resources they had recently won. As Martin Luther King Jr. noted shortly before his death: "it was useless for any black person to be allowed to eat in a restaurant if he or she could not afford to settle the check." McKissick created McKissick Enterprises to invest in black businesses focusing on the development of black economic power. According to McKissick, "Soul City was an idea before the movement. Soul City actually started after World War II, in my mind. And it was first talked about when we saw the use of the Marshall Plan, and all like that. See, I've always been in real estate and I've always been a businessman." 

Soul City was intended to be a new town built from the ground up and open to all races, but placed emphasis on providing opportunities for minorities and the poor.  It was also designed to be a means of reversing out-migration of minorities and the poor to urban areas; the opportunities Soul City provided, such as jobs, education, housing, training, and other social services would help lessen the migration.

The city was planned to contain three villages housing 18,000 people by 1989. Soul City was projected to have 24,000 jobs and 44,000 inhabitants by 2004. It was intended to include industry and retail development for jobs, as well as residential housing and services. The plan was for residents to work, get schooling, shop, receive health care, and worship in town. Soul City was the first new town to be organized by African-American businesses. McKissick envisioned Soul City as a community where all races could live in harmony.

Federal funding and political opposition

McKissick believed the way to uplift African Americans at that time was through black capitalism. He said, "Unless the Black Man attains economic independence, any political independence will be an illusion. Nixon supported Black Capitalism and McKissick backed Nixon in his 1972 reelection in efforts of getting more funding from HUD. In 1972, the city received a grant of $14 million from HUD based on plans of attracting industry as well as developing residential housing and by the late 70s, the city had received more than $19 million federal funds with an additional $8 million from state and local sources. That same year in 1972, Jesse Helms, a conservative, was elected to Congress. Helms used to be a Democrat but won senator for North Carolina as a Republican. At that time the Republican party supported Black capitalism. However though Helms was now a Republican, he still kept many of his conservative Democratic views. Helms saw Soul City as a misappropriation of federal funds.

In 1975, Soul City came under attack by two North Carolinians in Congress, Republican Senator Jesse Helms and Democratic Representative L.H. Fountain, who successfully pushed for an audit of Soul City, which Helms called "an insult to the hard-pressed taxpayers of North Carolina and the nation".

Warren County 
McKissick chose Warren County, one of the poorest counties in North Carolina, as the site for Soul City. Though there was a huge out migration of blacks from North Carolina, Warren County was majority black with more than 60 percent being African American. Warren County ranked in the lowest 10 of the 100 counties in North Carolina. The majority black county had an average median income of $1,958 in 1960 but for blacks it was $1,308 as most worked in low income agriculture jobs. The school systems were very impoverished and most people lacked standard education as over 40% did not finish high school.  Warren county also lacked adequate health care services. Before Soul City started construction Warren and neighboring county had just twelve general practitioners for the forty-eight thousand residents. Once McKissick started construction of Soul City, the first request by citizens was the development of a healthcare facility. Though there were many drawbacks to developing Soul City in Warren County, the plot of land McKissick chose also had potential. The site was near interstate 85 and major railroad tracks. McKissick hoped the available transport networks would attract industry to the site.

Rise and decline

By 1974, pioneering families moved to Soul City and steady progress was apparent in the laying of water and sewer lines, construction of roads, a day care center, a health care center, and early construction of "Soul Tech I" (with 52,000 square feet of industrial space).

Soul City's decline was caused by several factors, such as the local economy of Warren County, the national economy, and negative press coverage. Warren County had over 40% of people not graduating high school. The shortage of skilled laborers and lack of industrial experience deterred some industries from moving to Soul City. The US economy had a major downturn in 1974 as inflation hit double digits in 1973 and 1974. For the rest of the decade, the country went through "stagflation", "the simultaneous burden of inflation and unemployment." The current state of the national economy made many industrial companies cautious of expanding. The Soul City Company (SCC) reported that CC Grander, a utility company and Burlington Industries, a textile company both had plans to move to Soul City but halted their expansion during the economic uncertainty of the country. The HUD's new town programs were signed and launched during the country's economic downturn. Some argue that Soul City as well as other new town programs would have succeeded if there had not been an economic recession. Michael Spear, the former general manager the new town of Columbia, Maryland, commented that "launching a new towns program in the early 1970s was like asking the Wright brothers to test their airplane in a hurricane and then concluding, when it crashed, that the invention did not work." 

The negative press coverage of some media companies deterred not just industries but also white home owners. The press covered Soul city as a "new black town", which made it unappealing for white residents to move in. The Wall Street Journal, which had significant credence in the business community, portrayed McKissick in a negative manner as a lavish living lawyer. The Journal damaged McKissick's name and identity, which negatively impacted his efforts in bringing in new industry. The city failed to reach its initial ambitions. Lawsuits and investigations into the use of funds by the Soul City Company, the city's developers, resulted in foreclosure in 1979 despite eventually being cleared by a Government Accountability Office audit. 

Since that time, the city has grown somewhat, but not to the size originally planned. The former Soultech 1 building was purchased by the adjoining Warren County Correctional Institution for expansion. A number of new homes have been constructed. The lawsuits, negative media coverage, and mainly the lack of industries moving into Warren County eventually caused HUD to pull its funding for Soul City in June 1979.

Soul City Now 
Soul City has not reached the ambitions McKissick planned for, however there are still some positive outcomes from the project. Soul City brought the first health care facility to the residents of Warren County, a three county water system and a sewage disposal system. There was a high number of out migration of African Americans from the south to northern cities. However, after Soul City was created, more African Americans moved to North Carolina than out in the 1970s and this was the first time since the Reconstruction Era. In 1980, 35 housing units, a clinic, a tennis court, and a pool had been developed. About 150 people were employed in the city.

Notable people

Representative Eva Clayton lived in and worked for Soul City Company before being appointed to a state position in community development, and later being elected to the  United States Congress. The town lies within the 1st congressional district of North Carolina.

See also
 Mound Bayou, Mississippi

References

External resources 

 Floyd B. McKissick. Soul City North Carolina, 1974 on Hathi Trust (14 pages).
 Amanda Shapiro. "Welcome to the Soul City." Oxford American, A Magazine of the South 80 (Spring 2013). online version from April 4, 2016.
 Soul City - A dream. Will it come true? Dan Hull, The Chronicle, Duke University, March 1, 1974

Planned cities in the United States
Utopian communities in the United States
Populated places established in 1969
Warren County, North Carolina
1969 establishments in North Carolina
Unincorporated communities in North Carolina
Unincorporated communities in Warren County, North Carolina
Populated places in North Carolina established by African Americans